Inspector Gadget is an animated science fiction comedy series from the mid–1980s co-created by Andy Heyward, Jean Chalopin and Bruno Bianchi, and was originally syndicated by DIC Audiovisuel and Lexington Broadcast Services Company. The series stars the voice of Don Adams as the titular character, and first premiered on September 12, 1983. It is the first cartoon show to be syndicated by DIC, who specifically created the series to help expand into the North American market, and the first animated series to be presented in stereo sound. The program originally ran from 1983 to 1986, broadcasting 86 episodes over two seasons, and remained in syndication into the late 1990s. The show revolves around the adventures of a clumsy, dim-witted detective named Inspector Gadgeta cyborg human with various bionic gadgets built into his bodywho is sent on missions to thwart plans by his nemesis Dr. Claw, the leader of an evil organization known as "M.A.D.", unknowingly being assisted by his niece Penny and their dog, Brain.

The TV series proved to be a success for DIC, not only launching the Inspector Gadget franchise, including additional animated productions, such as a 2015 sequel series, and two live-action films, but also encouraging the company to produce additional programs such as Heathcliff.

Since 2012, the rights to Inspector Gadget have been owned by WildBrain (previously DHX Media) through its in-name-only unit, Cookie Jar Entertainment. Cookie Jar had purchased DiC and its library of shows in 2008, and was itself acquired by DHX Media in 2012.

Premise 

Inspector Gadget, the titular character of the series, is a world-famous cyborg police inspector who works for a secret police organization that combats crime across the globe, with each of his missions focused on thwarting the criminal schemes of M.A.D. (which stands for "Mean And Dirty")a criminal organization led by the nefarious Dr. Claw, and conducted by his agents. Missions that he undertakes often occur in a foreign locale, or within the fictional city of Metro City. Despite the fact that Inspector Gadget is equipped with numerous gadgets to help him, including a personal vehicle that can morph between a family minivan to a compact police car, he is ultimately incompetent and clueless on each mission, often uses a gadget that he did not call for, and is sometimes prone to causing trouble inadvertently for those around him - an example of this is a running gag, inspired by the "self-destruct" message, in which Inspector Gadget is given briefing messages from his boss Chief Quimby, who primarily hands them to him while in disguise, only to have them unintentionally returned to him before they detonate.

In reality, the investigations are often conducted by Inspector Gadget's niece Penny, who secretly operates behind the scenes to thwart M.A.D.'s plot and ensure that her uncle remains out of harm's way, as Dr. Claw frequently instructs his agents to get rid of Inspector Gadget before he can stop them. Even though Inspector Gadget is incompetent, he always escapes danger due to luck, either from a misfired gadget, or from the secret assistance of the family dog Brain, who usually shadows him in disguise; on most occasions, his disguise often causes Inspector Gadget to chase him in the mistaken belief that he is a M.A.D. agent. While Penny remains in contact with Brain during her investigation, she is often placed in danger and either escapes by recalling Brain to help, or using her own technology. Despite the pair's involvement, both make it certain that Inspector Gadget is seen to have completed the mission in Quimby's opinion; in some cases, Inspector Gadget actually completes a mission, though usually through his own luck. Dr. Claw always vows revenge on Inspector Gadget for thwarting his schemes, and flees the scene on most occasions having been on site to oversee his plans.

Like many cartoons made in the 1980s, Inspector Gadget always ended each episode with a public service announcement advising how to handle a situation, such as the danger of dealing with strangers.

Characters 
 Inspector Gadget  (Inspecteur Gadget in French) is voiced by Don Adams. Despite being laden with many gadgets in his body, he is frequently clueless, bungles his cases and gets himself into danger, only escaping from trouble and completing his missions with luck. (In the earliest produced episodes, Gadget was halfway brilliant, deducing that Dr. Claw is nearby and even became infuriated when he lost his nemesis in a high-speed chase) A policeman by nature, he is a caring family man that often takes risks to protect his niece Penny and their dog Brain, and has a firm disbelief in the supernatural. His character often utters four catchphrases during episodes"Wowsers!", at times of shock and complete surprise; "Go-Go-Gadget", which is often spoken before Gadget names the gadget he intends to use; "Is that you, Chief? You're where?", uttered when Chief Quimby calls Gadget on his next assignment; and "I'm always on duty", which is also said to Quimby before Gadget leaves for his assignment. He often introduces himself with, "My name is Inspector Gadget", and otherwise it is implied that "Inspector" is his actual first name (rather than a title) and "Gadget" his surname.
 Penny  (Sophie in French) Inspector Gadget's niece. She is the true "brains" behind Inspector Gadget's investigations, and the one responsible for foiling M.A.D.'s schemes, a fact only known to Brain. Her investigations are conducted in secret, in which she uses two pieces of technologya hi-tech computer disguised as a book; and a special utility wristwatch, which she frequently uses to communicate with Brain and monitor her uncle's activities with. Penny often gets kidnapped by M.A.D. when they catch her snooping into their affairs, but manages to escape with her technology or by calling on Brain for help. Penny's dependence on her computer book is often played for suspense: she will be separated from her book at a key moment and be unable to save the day until she reacquires it. When an investigation is nearing its completion, Penny frequently contacts her uncle's boss in secret to alert him to Gadget's "arrest" of the culprit in the scheme he is investigating. The writers of the series never elaborate on who Penny's parents are, nor revealed them in any of the episodes (hinting that she might be an orphan).
 Brain  (Finot in French) The family dog, assists in investigations by secretly keeping Gadget out of danger, and on several occasions coming to Penny's aid when she needs him. The series' writers designed the character to be highly intelligent and resourceful, often becoming bipedal in order to operate under a number of disguises aimed at fooling Gadget and/or the M.A.D. Agents. A running gag is that Gadget will typically befriend M.A.D. Agents and remain oblivious to their attempts to kill him, while exclusively perceiving Brain as a M.A.D. Agent he needs to arrest. Brain is outfitted with a hi-tech collar that conceals a retractable video communications system linked to Penny's wristwatch, in which he communicates to her through a mixture of pantomime and physical gestures. By Season 2, Brain was using this video link to 'talk' to Penny in dog-talk reminiscent of Scooby-Doo.
 Chief Quimby  (Chef Gontier in French) Inspector Gadget's short-tempered boss. The chief of police in Metro City, Quimby specialises in the use of disguises in order to pass on a message containing Inspector Gadget's briefing for his next message, a frequent plot element used at the beginning of each episode, as well as seeing him towards the end to congratulate him on a job well done, never realising that Inspector Gadget's niece is responsible for foiling Dr. Claw's plots or alerting him secretly to where he and the police need to be. As a running gag, Inspector Gadget is oblivious to the message's "self-destruct" element and returns it to his boss prior to it blowing up, always unintentionally and occasionally through sheer bad luck on Quimby's part. The character is frequently portrayed with a pipe in his mouth, is often on the receiving end of a mishap from Inspector Gadget's bumbling nature, and is accompanied by his own theme music during his main scene in the episode.
 Doctor Claw  (Docteur Gang in French) The leader of the evil M.A.D. organization. Dr. Claw often operates his schemes via a computer terminal, while accompanied by his pet cat M.A.D. Cat (a reference to James Bond villain Ernst Stavro Blofeld), usually either within a base that is often depicted as an old castle, or from within his personal craft the M.A.D. Mobilea black-and-red vehicle that can transform between a car, jet, and submersible, which he always escapes in when his latest scheme has failed whilst he is on location at or near where it is being conducted. Dr. Claw considers Inspector Gadget to be his greatest nemesis, despite being aware of his idiocy, but does know about Penny and Brain's involvement in his missions; however, both he and his M.A.D. agents presume they are simply under orders by Inspector Gadget to spy on their operations, and are never fully aware that they are the real brains behind his schemes being thwarted. The character always uses his catchphrase"I'll get you next time, Gadget! Next time!"at the end of each episode (during the end credits), often to illustrate his desire for revenge against Inspector Gadget. He is never seen, aside from his arms.
 Corporal Capeman  Inspector Gadget's sidekick, introduced in the second season, and voiced by Townsend Coleman. Capeman is a self-proclaimed superhero who acts in the manner of a stereotypical crime fighter, yet despite being more observant of details than the Inspector, he is equally as inept at interpreting them. Capeman dislikes Brain and is occasionally mean to him, despite Brain getting him out of trouble. Capeman is also obsessed with learning to fly and often mistakenly believes he has miraculously acquired the power of flight while in the midst of dire circumstances. Gadget almost always mispronounces Capeman's name as "Capman", while Penny calls him "Capey".

Conception 

The series was created by Andy Heyward, Jean Chalopin, and Bruno Bianchi. The three developed the project for DIC Audiovisuel. The initial idea for Inspector Gadget came from Heyward, who also wrote the pilot episode with the help of Jean Chalopin in 1982 ("Winter Olympics", often syndicated as episode #65, "Gadget in Winterland"). Chalopin, who at the time owned the DIC Audiovisuel studio, helped develop the format and concept for the rest of the episodes together with Bruno Bianchi, who designed the main characters and served as supervising director. Part of the project's existence was to recoup costs incurred by DiC and TMS Entertainment when a planned collaboration, a spin-off of Lupin the Third called Lupin VIII, was cancelled due to financial disputes with the estate of Arsène Lupin creator Maurice Leblanc.

According to the DVD bonus film "Wowsers", a retrospective featurette with co-creators Andy Heyward and Mike Maliani on the four-disc DVD set Inspector Gadget: The Original Series, Gadget went through approximately 350 sketches before reaching his final design. Gadget's design also included a mustache in the pilot before it was dropped for the rest of the series, due to DiC being sued by MGM as the character looked too similar to Inspector Clouseau. A fourth version of the pilot was recorded where lines were added to explain the mustache away (Penny: "You know, uncle, I really like your new mustache." Inspector Gadget: "It's so that nobody will recognize me. I'm on vacation – absolutely, totally, and completely off-duty.").

Analysis 
The titular character of the series, Inspector Gadget, is both a police inspector and a cyborg. Gadget is dressed in a Mackintosh raincoat and trilby hat. When he uses the phrase "go-go gadget", various "useful bionic gadgets" are activated and emerge from underneath his coat and hat. The gadgets are built into his body, and often malfunction. Inspector Gadget is a bionic man with enhancements attached to his body. The original television series gave no background for him. The spin-off television series Gadget Boy & Heather (1995-1998) gives an origin story for him. In this version, Gadget was conceived as a bionic child who has the mind of an adult detective. His bionic enhancements are creations of Myron Dabble, an inventor who lives in Switzerland. The various hidden appliances within Gadget render him a cyborg equivalent of a Swiss Army knife, a multi-tool. The enhancements were intended to grant him status as a "super sleuth". His body has been upgraded, but his intellect has received no equivalent enhancements. Inspector Gadget has access to many different weapons and gadgets, but seems to lack in intellect. He habitually blunders his way through cases, in a style similar to Inspector Clouseau. Terry Rowan describes Gadget as "clumsy" and "dimwitted". Despite his advanced equipment, Gadget is clueless and incompetent. He constantly faces obstacles and perils, but manages to survive by either his own good luck or covert help by Penny and Brain. The car which Inspector Gadget drives is a Matra Murena. Inspector Gadget's boss is Chief Quimby. Inspector Gadget is covertly assisted by his niece Penny, who is typically the person who actually solves their cases. Penny is a master of investigation and technology. Her main technological devices are a computer in the form of a book, and a wristwatch that is actually a device with multiple uses. She secretly monitors her uncle's activities and intervenes to help him. She foils the plans of M.A.D. Due to the secrecy of her activities, she never receives credit for them and only her dog is aware of them. Penny herself is assisted by her pet dog Brain. Brain has human-level intellect and is bipedal. Brain is often tasked with keeping Inspector Gadget safe and uses various disguises. The second season of the series also introduced an actual sidekick for Inspector Gadget, called Corporal Capeman. The main opponents to Gadget and his supporting cast are the members of the evil organization M.A.D. Gadget's archenemy is Dr. Claw, the leader of the organization. Dr. Claw serves mostly as an unseen character. Typically only his hands and arms are visible. His hands are covered by gauntlets. Dr. Claw is depicted sitting in front of a computer terminal, from where he monitors the developments of his various schemes. His headquarters are located at an old castle. Niall Richardson and Adam Locks, cultural studies scholars, cite Inspector Gadget as an example of the "physical cyborg" concept. These types of characters are part man, and part machine. The concept was popularized by cinema and television. The writers cite as other examples of this type Steve Austin, Darth Vader, Iron Man, and RoboCop.

In their published book You Might Be a Zombie and Other Bad News, the editors of Cracked.com interpret the series as implying serious problems for Penny. The parents of Penny never appear in the television series and are not even mentioned. The implication is that the parents have either disappeared or are deceased. Like many child characters from "classic cartoons", Penny is an orphan. Inspector Gadget is her legal guardian. While Penny is referred to as Gadget's "niece" and not as his ward, the editors question whether the two characters are biologically related. There is no resemblance in the physical features of Inspector Gadget and Penny. Penny also differs from Inspector Gadget in behavior and in her superior competence. A running gag of the series is how Inspector Gadget handles explosives. He disposes clearly-labeled explosive devices by "carelessly tossing" them away. The devices always end up exploding in proximity to Inspector Gadget's employer. The editors see Inspector Gadget as incapable of surviving on his own and point that his machinery tends to malfunction. A recurring situation in the series, is Inspector Gadget warning Penny not to follow him on a mission supposedly too dangerous for her. The editors view Penny as having no choice in actually ignoring the warnings. If she fails to ensure Inspector Gadget's survival, she will lose her legal guardian and end up in an orphanage.

According to the A Dictionary of Sociology, Inspector Gadget is a science fiction series. It is one of several works in this genre to be inspired by the concept of the cyborg, as defined in the 1960s by electronic engineers Manfred Clynes and Nathan S. Kline. The term referred to organisms with cybernetic enhancements which would be capable of surviving in extraterrestrial environments. The idea was that advancements in engineering would enable human functions to be replaced with mechanical parts and computer-controlled systems. Clynes and Kline were not science fiction writers, but their concept inspired "much science fiction writing". Besides Inspector Gadget and its eponymous character, other examples cited in the dictionary include RoboCop, Steve Austin, Luke Skywalker, and the Borg. Animation historian David Perlmutter places the series in its historical content for American television animation. He considers the original Inspector Gadget television series to be the first production of DIC Entertainment intended for American television and the most famous creation of this production company. He states that the series set the company on the course that it would follow for the next three decades but he considers most of its subsequent series to be less successful.

Despite being an inspector, Gadget is depicted more as a "globe-trotting secret agent" than a detective. The series was action-oriented, but much of the action was intended to be comical. It managed to effectively blend elements of action fiction and comedy, in a manner that was unusual for the 1980s. The TV series was created for the syndication market and turned out to be a profitable hit. A total of 86 episodes were produced. In part, its success was fueled by good publicity. In the United States, the series received unusually extensive press coverage for a work of television animation. The attention of the press was attracted by the casting of Don Adams in the title role. Besides his own ineptness, Inspector Gadget's effectiveness as a detective was undermined by his cheerful optimism. As conceived by Andy Heyward, from Inspector Gadget's view of the world, the sun is always shining. He is usually unable to perceive danger. Inspector Gadget's villains are similarly ineffective. Their attempts to get rid of Inspector Gadget are as flawed as those of Boris Badenov to get rid of his own opponents. Penny is a more effective character than her uncle. Despite being a pre-teen girl, she is the one actually conducting investigations and solving cases. She was often kidnapped, but this did not reduce the importance of the character to the series. Perlmutter considers Penny to be an unusually resourceful and intelligent female character, by the standards of the 1980s. Penny's "computer book" was effectively a handheld computer, an electronic organizer, and a mobile phone. Perlmutter considers this element of the series to have anticipated real-life technological advancements in these fields. Brain seems to have a superhuman intellect and is a master of disguise. He acts more like Penny's field agent than her pet dog. M.A.D. is depicted as an efficient criminal cartel, and its leader Dr. Claw is seemingly an effective administrator. However, most of Claw's agents are depicted as buffoons, and Perlmutter finds them similar to the characters depicted by the Three Stooges. Dr. Claw himself is the most menacing figure among them. At the end of episodes, Dr. Claw's wrathful and intimidating voice is heard, threatening to "get" Inspector Gadget when their paths next cross. Besides the main cast of the series, the episodes feature another recurring character, Chief Quimby. Chief Quimby informs Inspector Gadget about his assignments through self-destructing paper messages. Inevitably, the messages blow up the Chief himself. The explosions are played for laughs. Due to various recurring elements in the series, often the basic plot of each episode was the same. The geographic location of each episode differed, however, and provided for some variety in the series. The series effectively provided viewers with both comedic and dramatic moments. Despite the censorship standards for American animated series in effect during the 1970s and 1980s, the series also included elements of slapstick comedy. This was nearly forbidden at the time, but the censorship was less strict for syndication series and the studio got away with it. The success of Inspector Gadget encouraged DIC to invest in the production of more animated series for the American market, starting with The Littles (1983). Multiple new series were produced in 1984.

Production

Writers 
Nelvana writer Peter Sauder was the head writer for season 1, which was co-produced by DiC. As Nelvana was no longer part of the production by season 2, the show was written by the DIC studio employees Eleanor Burian-Mohr, Mike O'Mahoney, Glen Egbert, and Jack Hanrahan. Hanrahan and Burian-Mohr would later write the Christmas special Inspector Gadget Saves Christmas as well as many episodes of the Gadget Boy spinoff series, and Burian-Mohr additionally wrote dialogue for the educational show Inspector Gadget's Field Trip.

Animation 
After the pilot, the first 64 -minute episodes were written, designed, storyboarded, and voice-recorded in Toronto, Ontario, Canada at the Nelvana facilities, (which co-produced the series under DiC's supervision), with creative supervision by Jean Chalopin. Bruno Bianchi was the Supervising Director. Most of those episodes were animated in Tokyo, Japan by TMS Entertainment, while a few episodes were animated in Taiwan by Cuckoo's Nest Studio, before being finished in post production by DiC and Nelvana. The pilot episode, "Winter Olympics" (a.k.a. "Gadget in Wonderland"), was animated by TMS's subsidiary; Telecom Animation Film and had a slightly higher budget than the rest of the episodes. The additional production facilities for TMS-animated episodes are AIC, and Oh! Production. Sunrise, and Toei Animation (uncredited) helped with the ink and painting process for the TMS-animated episodes.

Nelvana was not involved with the show's 21-episode second season, in which pre-production was now moved to DiC's own Los Angeles-based headquarters. The animation and post-production was generally done at K.K. DiC Asia (later Creativity & Development Asia), a Japanese animation house Jean Chalopin co-founded that DiC had some ownership in at the time.

Voice cast 
The role of Inspector Gadget went through two different voice actors for the pilot episode before Don Adams was cast. In the first version of the pilot episode, the voice of Inspector Gadget was provided by Jesse White. A second version of the pilot was made with the only difference being Gary Owens re-recording all of White's dialogue with a deep-toned mid-Atlantic accent. Eventually, producers decided to cast actor Don Adams in the role, re-recording all of Inspector Gadget's dialogue in the pilot to make it more reminiscent of Maxwell Smart. A fourth version of the pilot was made for broadcast with Frank Welker re-recording one line as Inspector Gadget to explain the mustache.

Dr. Claw, M.A.D. Cat, and Brain were voiced by Frank Welker. Welker and Adams recorded their dialogue in separate recordings in Los Angeles, while the rest of the first season's cast recorded in Toronto. Don Francks initially replaced Welker as Dr. Claw for 25 episodes following the pilot before Welker was called in to replace him for those episodes. However, Welker was unable to re-record a few episodes, where Francks' voice remained. Francks remained with the show, however, and usually performed the voice of a henchman of Dr. Claw. Sometimes Francks would portray a secondary M.A.D. agent, with Welker (who usually performed the voices of the agents otherwise) as the other in episodes where Francks' voice was necessary. Penny was originally voiced by Mona Marshall in the pilot and was subsequently portrayed by Don Francks' daughter, Cree Summer, for the rest of the first season in her first voice acting role. Chief Quimby was voiced by John Stephenson in the original pilot, and later by Dan Hennessey for the remainder of the first season.

When production of Inspector Gadget moved from Nelvana in Toronto to DiC's headquarters in Los Angeles for the second season, all of the Canadian-based voice artists were replaced. Holly Berger replaced Cree Summer Francks as the voice of Penny while Maurice LaMarche replaced Dan Hennessey as the voice of Chief Quimby. Occasionally, LaMarche would fill in for Don Adams as Inspector Gadget whenever necessary.

Music 
The theme music was inspired by Edvard Grieg's movement "In the Hall of the Mountain King" and was composed by Shuki Levy. For many years, Levy had a partnership with his friend Haim Saban, with Levy composing the music and Saban running the business. Their record company, Saban Records, (now Saban Music Group) has provided music for many DiC cartoons and children's shows in the 1980s and 1990s, and is still running today.

Many of the background music cues were a variation of the Gadget melody. Even at festivals or dances in the cartoon, the Gadget theme was often played. Occasionally during an episode, such as in "Launch Time" and "Ghost Catchers", Inspector Gadget would hum his own theme music. Levy also had a range of other musical cues for each character, as well as cues for the various moods of the scenes. Penny and Brain each had several different versions of their respective musical themes.

The theme song was sampled in the song "The Show" by Doug E. Fresh and Slick Rick and "Rockin' to the P.M." by Raw Fusion on the album Live from the Styleetron. It was also sampled on "I'll Be Your Everything," performed by Youngstown, which served as the theme song for the live action film.

In her book Robot Takeover: 100 Iconic Robots of Myth, Popular Culture & Real Life, Scissor Sisters singer Ana Matronic says she considers the theme music to be widely recognized around the world. The series was a "global hit" and its theme song became "iconic". However, she notes that copies of the original television soundtrack had become extremely rare by 2010.

History

Season 1 
The pilot episode featured a slightly different opening and closing credits and a moustached Gadget. In a later version of the pilot, dialogue by Penny and Inspector Gadget was re-dubbed explaining Inspector Gadget's mustache as a disguise for the holiday. Since DiC was a French company looking to expand its operations to the US, the show was produced for release in both France and the US. It was broadcast in North America in September 1983, nine months after the pilot was previewed on five stations. A month later, the series premiered in France, whose version also featured a theme song with French lyrics and the French title Inspecteur Gadget appearing in front of the episode.

The first season was aired on weekdays from September 12, 1983 to December 9, 1983 and comprised 65 episodes.

Season 2 
The first-season episodes were repeated during the 1984–1985 season, with 21 new episodes airing on Saturdays for the second season of Inspector Gadget from September 1985 to February 1986. Several changes were made to the established formula.

The format of the series changed significantly. In the second season, the episodes would feature three short segments in a row sharing the same general theme and often the same villains, who were still not arrested by the end of their final episode. Many of the episodes revolved around M.A.D. trying to get rid of Inspector Gadget, instead of Dr. Claw's crimes and plots to dominate the world from the first season.

New characters and settings were introduced. Inspector Gadget, Penny, and Brain moved into a high-tech house filled with many gadgets. In the season's fourth episode, Corporal Capeman was introduced as Inspector Gadget's sidekick.

Broadcast history 
In the United States, the series originally ran from 1983 to 1986 in national first-run syndication and remained in syndication into the late-1990s. Repeats of the series briefly appeared on CBS's Saturday morning cartoon lineup from 1991 to 1992. Nickelodeon also aired reruns of the show from October 1, 1987 until August 31, 1992, and again from November 4, 1996 until April 29, 2000. Internationally, it aired on various TV stations and remained in syndication into the late-1990s. Various stations, such as Global Television Network, and The Family Channel aired Inspector Gadget until the late-1990s. Inspector Gadget was seen on Qubo from August 31, 2019 until the channel's shutdown on February 28, 2021. As of early 2022, Inspector Gadget can be streamed on the Paramount+ streaming service as well as on The Roku Channel.

Merchandise

Soundtrack 

A soundtrack LP to accompany the series, named Inspecteur Gadget: Bande Originale de la Serie TV, was released in France in 1983 by Saban Records. Wagram Music made it available on online services such as Spotify and iTunes.

The soundtrack features the following tracks:

 Le Thème de Inspecteur Gadget (Inspector Gadget's Theme)
 Le Thème de Sophie (Penny's Theme)
 La Chanson De Finot (Brain The Dog)
 Gadget on Mars
 Ghost
 Mad Art in Museum
 Gadget in Japan
 Chocolate Factory
 Rodeo
 M.A.D's Theme
 Heroes in African Jungle
 Gadget with the Incas
 Look Out
 Gadget in Trouble
 Arabian Desert
 The Sophisticated Gadget
 Train Theme
 Kingdom
 Car Race
 Pharaohs
 Penny's Theme (Instrumental)
 Inspector Gadget (Instrumental)

With the exception of the first three-song tracks and the tracks "M.A.D's Theme" and "Penny's Theme", all the music on this album is background scores for the TV series. The album is far from a complete soundtrack, as there were probably several hours of source music used in the series. Some tracks on the album are more location/episode-specific or for special sequences. There were also at least two other records released by Saban Records (both in French). One of these was the single of the theme music (with French vocals, released both in 1983 and 1985 with different sleeve covers), and another was an audio story named "La Malediction du roi Touthankarton", based on the episode "Curse of the Pharaohs".  
The French title is a word play with the name of Pharaoh "TouthankAMon. In french, "TouthankARTon" sounds like "Tout en carton" (all in carton).

An English-language soundtrack LP, entitled "Inspector Gadget – The Music", was released in Australia in 1986 through ABC Records. While many of its tracks overlapped with those of the French LP, 5 tracks were exclusive to the Australian LP: "Inspector Gadget Theme" (an extended version of Inspector Gadget's American opening theme), "Brain The Dog" (an instrumental background music version of Brain's theme), "Max's theme" (a misspelling of "Mad's theme", this is an alternate version of the same composition on the French LP, with slightly different orchestrations), "Italian Gadget" (a piece of background music) and "Gadget Closing" (the American end credits theme for the show).

 Home media 

 North America 
The Meier Group first released VHS tapes of the series in 1983, each containing a single episode. These releases continued on through companies such as Family Home Entertainment, Kideo Video (distributed through Karl-Lorimar Home Video) and Buena Vista Home Video.

In 1999 Buena Vista Home Video released Inspector Gadget: Gadget's Greatest Gadgets, a direct-to-video feature that contained three episodes of the TV series. It was made to tie in with the Disney film, Inspector Gadget.

On July 6, 2004, Sterling Entertainment released a VHS/DVD called Inspector Gadget: The Gadget Files. The release contains the show's pilot Winter Olympics alongside the first two episodes of the series, which are "Monster Lake" and "Down on the Farm". The DVD version contains "Gadget at the Circus" and "The Amazon" as bonus episodes, alongside an interview with Andy Heyward answering 10 questions voted upon by fans. The Sterling release of Inspector Gadget Saves Christmas contains the episodes "Weather in Tibet" and "Birds of a Feather" with  "So It is Written" as a bonus episode.

In 2006, Shout! Factory acquired the rights to the series and subsequently released Inspector Gadget: The Original Series, a four-disc set featuring the first 22 episodes of the series on DVD on April 25, 2006, with Sony BMG Music Entertainment. There are errors on the box concerning which episodes are on each disc. The last episode listed on each disc is actually the first episode on the next disc. 20th Century Fox Home Entertainment would later acquire the home video rights for the series.

On September 9, 2009, 20th Century Fox Home Entertainment released a single-disc DVD, Inspector Gadget: The Go Go Gadget Collection which features ten episodes from the series.

On May 24, 2013 TV Shows on DVD noted that New Video Group had acquired the home video rights to the series. New Video Group released the complete series on DVD in Region 1 for the very first time in four volume sets on October 8, 2013. They also re-released Inspector Gadget Saves Christmas on October 29, 2013.

The series is also available on Amazon, on demand, and iTunes (in US and Canada) for purchase.

 Australia 
All season one episodes except for Quizz Master were released as three-disc box sets by Magna Pacific on November 9, 2006; July 3, 2007; and October 11, 2007. These are named Inspector Gadget – The Original Series: Box Set 1, Inspector Gadget - The Original Series: Box Set 2, and Inspector Gadget - The Original Series: Box Set 3, respectively. Inspector Gadget - The Original Series: Box Set 1 contains the version of the pilot episode where Gary Owens voices Gadget. In Inspector Gadget - The Original Series: Box Set 3 three of the episodes were edited: "Funny Money", "Tree Guesses", and "Fang the Wonderdog". These episodes had small edits made to them. For example, in the episode "Tree Guesses", a scene with a lumberjack M.A.D. agent throwing numerous axes at Inspector Gadget was cut out.

All three box sets were released together as Inspector Gadget: 25th Anniversary Collection (9 Disc Box Set), released in Australia by MagnaPacific on November 5, 2008.

 Europe 
In Europe, various independent DVD distributors would hold the rights to Jetix's programming library, including the DIC shows they owned. For example, in the UK, Maximum Entertainment released three DVD sets consisting of the first 13 episodes of Season 1; both "Volume 1" and "Volume 2" contained five episodes each. Volume 1 was re-released by Maximum in 2007 as "Five Crazy Episodes" and another DVD titled "Pirate Island" was released in 2008, containing five episodes. A 4-disc boxset containing the same episodes as Maximum's releases was issued by Lace DVD in 2010.Inspektor Gadget: Die komplette Staffel 1 (English translation: Inspector Gadget: The Complete Season 1) was released in Germany by More Music and Media on March 19, 2010. The 10-disc set includes all 65 episodes from the first Season, but with only German audio.

 Legacy and spin-off incarnations Inspector Gadget was adapted into a 1999 live action film by Disney starring Matthew Broderick as the titular character, Dabney Coleman as Chief Quimby, Michelle Trachtenberg as Penny, and Rupert Everett as Dr. Claw, with Gadget's original voice actor, Don Adams, as Brain in a post-credits scene. It was panned by critics, fans and audiences, and because of it, the movie earned a 21% approval rating on Rotten Tomatoes.

A direct-to-video sequel was released in 2003. Broderick did not reprise his role as the title character; he was replaced by French Stewart. Elaine Hendrix was the lead female character as G2, and Caitlin Wachs portrayed Penny replacing Trachtenberg. D. L. Hughley reprises his role as the Gadgetmobile; he is the only star from the first film who appears in the sequel.

In January 2009, IGN named Inspector Gadget as the 54th best in the Top 100 Best Animated TV Shows.

In 2011, a new Inspector Gadget comic book was published in the United States by Viper Comics. Written by Dale Mettam and illustrated by José Cobá, the style of the book is based on the original 1983 television show. A preview comic was released on May 7, 2011, as part of the Free Comic Book Day, before the entire story was officially published as a 48-page book in August.

A new CGI animated Inspector Gadget TV series was developed in 2012. It was commissioned by Teletoon and put into pre-production by Cookie Jar Entertainment. It was mentioned by Ray Sharma, the CEO of XMG Studio, in January 2012. Sharma described how the success of the game had resulted in a new TV series being in the making: "We did 1 million downloads in a week, and it's reinvigorated the TV brand with a new TV series in production." In September 2012, Cookie Jar issued a short press release about the upcoming series, as part of the advertising for it during the MIPCOM market that October, stating: "Cookie Jar Entertainment is celebrating Inspector Gadget's 30th anniversary with the launch of a brand-new series with its Canadian broadcast partner TELETOON. The series will again revolve around the iconic bionic bumbling detective." On June 9, 2013, Teletoon officially announced the reboot series with two press pictures of Inspector Gadget's new look as well as a press release. The TV series is produced by DHX Media, which purchased Cookie Jar Group in 2012.

In May 2015, it was announced that a new film with a rebooted version of the character was in the works. Like the live-action movies, it would be by Disney, with Dan Lin producing it. In October 2019, Mikey Day and Streeter Seidell were hired to write the film.

 See also 
 List of French animated television series

 Notes 

 References 

 Sources 
 
 
 
 
 
 
 

 Further reading Go Go Gadget: The Creation of Inspector Gadget'' by Andy Heyward; 2016.

External links 

 Inspector Gadget at DHX Media
 
 
 
 Inspector Gadget at Don Markstein's Toonopedia. Archived from the original on September 17, 2016.

1983 American television series debuts
1983 Canadian television series debuts
1983 French television series debuts
1986 American television series endings
1986 Canadian television series endings
1986 French television series endings
1980s American animated television series
1980s Canadian animated television series
1980s French animated television series
American children's animated comic science fiction television series
Canadian children's animated comic science fiction television series
French children's animated comic science fiction television series
Cyborgs in television
English-language television shows
First-run syndicated television shows in Canada
First-run syndicated television programs in the United States
Inspector Gadget
Television series by DIC Entertainment
Television series by DHX Media
Television series by Fremantle (company)
Television series by Nelvana
American detective television series
Television series created by Jean Chalopin
Animated television series about robots